The 2005 OFC Under-17 Tournament was an association football competition in Oceania. It was the 11th edition of the OFC Under 17 Qualifying Tournament, Nine teams participated in the tournament.

The winning side qualified for the 2005 FIFA U-17 World Championship in Peru.

Australia won their tenth (and fourth consecutive) title after beating Vanuatu 1–0 in the final. This also marked Australia's final participation (and championship) in an OFC U-17 men's event as they would become members of the AFC starting the next year (2006).

Qualification
All member teams qualified automatically. New Zealand withdrew before the tournament began on March 3, citing financial reasons.

Samoa and American Samoa also withdrew.

The following teams participated in the tournament:

Group stage

Group A

Group B

Knockout stage

Semi-finals

Third place playoff

Final

Australia qualified for the U-17 World Cup.

References 

OFC U-17 Championship
Under 17 Tournament
2005
2005 in youth association football